Light and Shadows  is the thirtieth album by the jazz fusion group Casiopea recorded and released in 1997. This album features guest drummer Harvey Mason and also marks the return of the band's former drummer Akira Jimbo.

Track listing

Personnel
CASIOPEA are
Issei Noro - Guitars
Minoru Mukaiya - keyboards
Yoshihiro Naruse - Bass

Additional Musicians
Akira Jimbo - drums (M-2,3,4,7,8,9,10,11), Electric Percussion & Timbales (M-1,3,5,6,7,9)
Harvey Mason - Drums (M-1,5,6)

Production
Sound Produced - CASIOPEA
Executive Producer - Yuzo Watanabe

Recording Engineer - Hiroyuki Shimura, Don Murray
Assistant Engineer - Tadashi Yamaguchi, Doug Boehm
Mixing Engineer - Hiroyuki Shimura
Mastering Engineer - Mitsuo Koike

Instruments Technician -  Yasushi Horiuchi, Eisuke Sasaki

Art Direction & Design - Satoshi Yanagisawa
Photography - Yoshihito Sasaguchi

Release history

References

External links
 

1997 albums
Casiopea albums
Pony Canyon albums